The AFL Grand Final Sprint is a sprint running race contested by AFL players as part of the on-field entertainment on the day of the AFL Grand Final. The sprint was held each year from 1979 until 1985 and again in 1987 (when the league was known as the Victorian Football League), and then again every year since 2002. Geoff Ablett (/) has won the most Grand Final sprints, with four.

Sprint race
 
The staging running races as curtain-raisers to, or half-time entertainment during, football matches has been a common practice since the early days of football in Victoria. The establishment of a running race on the field during grand final day between players who were not taking part in the game first occurred in 1977. On the 1977 and 1978 Grand Final days, long-distance races run over a mile were staged, with each league club able to nominate up to two entrants. In 1979, the race was changed to a 100 m sprint, with one player per club taking part.

Between 1979 and 1987, the two clubs participating in the grand final had the option of providing one of their players who missed selection in the match, but they generally chose not to do so, meaning the sprint was usually contested by a field of 10 players during this era.

The race was not held from 1988 to 2001 but was reintroduced in 2002 (along with a goalkicking contest, which only lasted one year). With the number of league clubs having grown to 16 during the break in competition, a new format was adopted, with the players now split into two groups of eight for the heats (held before the grand final), and the top four from each heat advancing to the final (held at half-time of the grand final).

From 2006 until 2008, a handicapping system was used, similar to that used in the Stawell Gift. 

In 2020 and 2021, the Grand Final sprint took place at quarter-time rather than half-time. From 2022 onwards, the Grand Final sprint will take place pre-match rather than during the match.

In most years, entry has been limited to one player from each AFL club. On two occasions, two slots were open to non-AFL players, resulting in non-AFL-player victories on both occasions. In 2016, suburban footballer James Shirley won the race, while taxi driver Harvinder Singh (competing because the race was sponsored by taxi company 13cabs) finished last; and in 2018, under-18s footballers Godfrey Okereneyang and Melvin Monieh came first and second, respectively. The 2021 race was limited to Western Australian participants due to the COVID-19 pandemic.

Winners

See also
List of AFL Grand Final pre-match performances

References

Sprint
AFL Women's Grand Finals
Australian rules football-related lists
Sprint (running)
Recurring sporting events established in 1979
1979 establishments in Australia
Running in Australia